John R. Lopez IV (born 1968) is a justice of the Arizona Supreme Court.

Early life and education
Lopez received his bachelor's degree in political science and Middle Eastern studies from the University of Texas at Austin in 1992. After receiving his bachelor's degree, Lopez did graduate work in political science and Middle Eastern studies at the University of Chicago and graduated from the Arizona State University Sandra Day O'Connor College of Law in 1998. In law school, Lopez was the articles editor for the Arizona State Law Journal.

Legal career 
After law school Lopez clerked for Justice Charles Jones of the Arizona Supreme Court. He then worked at the law firm Bryan Cave as a commercial litigator.

Lopez worked for the United States Attorney's Office for more than 12 years, serving as an Executive Assistant United States Attorney, Chief Assistant, the Chief of Public Crimes and Public Integrity Section as well as Deputy Appellate Chief. He also served for six months as a legal advisor in Iraq consulting in the prosecution of Saddam Hussein. He served as the solicitor general for Arizona Attorney General Mark Brnovich immediately before his appointment to the Supreme Court.

Arizona Supreme Court 

On November 28, 2016, Governor Doug Ducey announced the appointment of Lopez to the Arizona Supreme Court to a newly created seat. He was sworn into office on December 19, 2016.

See also
List of Hispanic/Latino American jurists

References

External links
Court Application

1968 births
Living people
Place of birth missing (living people)
21st-century American judges
Arizona Republicans
Assistant United States Attorneys
Federalist Society members
Hispanic and Latino American judges
Justices of the Arizona Supreme Court
Sandra Day O'Connor College of Law alumni
Solicitors General of Arizona
University of Texas at Austin College of Liberal Arts alumni